Christian de Quincey is an American philosopher and author who teaches consciousness, spirituality and cosmology at universities and colleges in the United States and Europe. He is also an international speaker on consciousness.

Biography

De Quincey is a professor of Philosophy and Consciousness Studies at John F. Kennedy University, Dean of Consciousness Studies and the Arthur M. Young Professor of Philosophy at the University of Philosophical Research, and adjunct faculty at the Holmes Institute, and at Schumacher College, Devon, England. He is founder of The Wisdom Academy that offers personal mentoring in consciousness studies (combining the "four Gifts of Knowing: The Scientist's Gift of the senses and experimental method;  The Philosopher's Gift of reason and language; The Shaman's Gift of participatory feeling and alternative states of consciousness; The Mystic's Gift of transcendental intuition accessed in sacred silence"). His writings on consciousness have appeared in a number of academic journals and popular magazines.

His books include Radical Nature: The Soul of Matter (Park Street Press, 2010), Radical Knowing: Understanding Consciousness through Relationship (Park Street Press, 2005), Deep Spirit: Cracking the Noetic Code, a novel of visionary science and spirituality (Wisdom Academy Press, 2008), and Consciousness from Zombies to Angels: The Shadow and the Light of Knowing Who You Are (Park Street Press January 2009). His "Radical Consciousness" trilogy focuses on the nature of reality, the nature of consciousness and knowledge, and (in Radical Science: Exploring the Final Frontier of Consciousness [forthcoming]) he explores the transformations needed for a true science of consciousness. With Willis Harman, he co-authored The Scientific Exploration of Consciousness (Institute of Noetic Sciences, 1996).

He has worked in marketing and public relations, and as a journalist for various newspapers and magazines. De Quincey was formerly managing editor on Shift magazine (IONS Review), from the Institute of Noetic Sciences.

He served as adjunct faculty on the University of Arizona’s pioneering on-line degree course in consciousness studies, and as a member of advisory committee for the University of Arizona's Center for Consciousness Studies.

De Quincey earned his PhD in Philosophy and Religion from the California Institute of Integral Studies, and a master's degree in Consciousness Studies from John F. Kennedy University.

Publications
Radical Nature: Rediscovering the Soul of Matter (Invisible Cities Press, 2002)
Radical Knowing: Understanding Consciousness through Relationship (Park Street Press, 2005)
Deep Spirit: Cracking the Noetic Code (Casablanca Press, 2008)
Consciousness from Zombies to Angels: The Shadow and the Light of Knowing Who You Are (Park Street Press, 2009)
Radical Nature: The Soul of Matter (2nd edition) (Park Street Press, 2010)
The Scientific Exploration of Consciousness (co-author with Willis Harman) (Institute of Noetic Sciences, 1996).

See also
Panpsychism (a philosophical paradigm which has been defended by de Quincey)
Intersubjectivity (an epistemological position supported by de Quincey)
Bohmian Dialogue (a form of communication devised by quantum physicist David Bohm to explore wholeness in consciousness, which de Quincey acknowledges as an effective medium for intersubjective experience)
Transformation (a major aim of psychospiritual practice that involves a profound shift in one's experience of self and world, which de Quincey claims is essential for any true science of consciousness)
Alfred North Whitehead (British philosopher and pioneer of process philosophy, who has inspired much of de Quincey's work)
Ken Wilber (the theories of whom have been criticized by de Quincey)

Notes

External links
The Wisdom Acacdemy: founded by de Quincey
The WisdomBlog: de Quincey's "Consciousness News" blog
The University of Philosophical Research
Nature Has a Mind of Its Own by Christian de Quincey

Living people
Year of birth missing (living people)
John F. Kennedy University faculty
Consciousness studies
Panpsychism
University of Arizona faculty